Decimal classification is a type of library classification. Examples include:

 Dewey Decimal Classification (DDC)
 Korean Decimal Classification (KDC)
 Nippon Decimal Classification (NDC)

See also
 Classification
 Decimal
 Decimal section numbering